Warren Municipal Airport  is a city-owned, public-use airport located two nautical miles (4 km) east of the central business district of Warren, a city in Marshall County, Minnesota, United States.

Facilities and aircraft 
The Warren City Council voted to build an airport in 1965 for an estimated cost of $109,000. A dedication ceremony took place in August 1966.

Warren Municipal Airport covers an area of 167 acres (68 ha) at an elevation of 888 feet (271 m) above mean sea level. It has two runways: 12/30 is 3,199 by 75 feet (975 x 23 m) with an asphalt surface and 4/22 is 2,578 by 200 feet (786 x 61 m) with a turf surface.

For the 12-month period ending August 25, 2010, the airport had 19,000 general aviation aircraft operations, an average of 52 per day. At that time there were six aircraft based at this airport, all single-engine.  General aviation traffic is from agricultrual aircraft during the summer growing season, and from training activity from the University of North Dakota.

References

External links 
 Warren Municipal Airport (D37) at Minnesota DOT Airport Directory
 Aerial image as of April 1991 from USGS The National Map
 
 

Airports in Minnesota
Transportation in Marshall County, Minnesota